Nels Anderson (July 31, 1889 – October 8, 1986) was an early American sociologist who studied hobos, urban culture, and work culture.

Biography
Anderson studied at the University of Chicago under Robert E. Park and Ernest Burgess, whose Concentric zone model was one of the earliest models developed to explain the organization of urban areas. Anderson's first publication, The Hobo (1923),  was a work that helped pioneer participant observation as a research method to reveal the features of a society and was the first field research monograph of the famed Chicago School of Sociology, marking a significant milepost in the discipline of Sociology. The intent of this work was to help the hobos and homeless who were facing great social and economic problems in the Chicago area. He hoped that his work would help supply some insight into the life of this "urban jungle" and would lead to a better understanding between hobos and the rest of the Chicago community.

Anderson received his doctorate from New York University and taught at Columbia University from 1928 to 1934, when he became a civil servant. He worked as a public servant both in Washington, D.C. and abroad, mainly with agencies for work and welfare until 1953. He continued to publish work on hobos and the homeless under the alias Dean Stiff. In an autobiographical sequence of articles entitled "Sociology has Many Faces", he wrote that no matter where he was working during these 30 years of being in non-academic sociology work, he always felt he was using and applying his sociological knowledge.

During the war, he served in the Middle and Near East with merchant marine personnel. Following the war, he worked as labor relations expert in Germany. At age 65, he returned to research, invigorating social research in Germany and eventually becoming head of the UNESCO Institute for Social Science at Cologne, from 1953 to 1962. In 1965, he joined the Department of Sociology at the University of New Brunswick, where he served as a professor until 1977.

Throughout his career, Dr. Anderson's research focused on issues of contemporary relevance such as healthy cities and marginalized people. His work is currently subject to a revival, especially in Europe, where the efficacy of an ethnographic approach to the study of society and social problems is being rediscovered.

A conference celebrating the 85th anniversary of the publication of The Hobo was held in May 2008.

Bibliography

Notes

References
 
 

1889 births
1986 deaths
American sociologists
Columbia University faculty
New York University alumni
University of Chicago alumni
Academic staff of the University of New Brunswick